Egemen Bağış (born 23 April 1970) is a former Turkish politician of, former member of the Turkish parliament, and the former minister for EU Affairs and chief negotiator of Turkey in accession talks with the European Union. Currently, he serves as ambassador of Turkey to the Czech Republic.

Early life 
Bağış was born in Bingöl, Turkey, in 1970 into a family which originated from Siirt. He holds a Bachelor of Arts degree in Human Resources Management as well as a Master of Public Administration, both from the Baruch College of City University of New York.

Official responsibilities 
 Turkish ambassador to the Czech Republic (Since November 2019)
 Member of the Turkish Parliament, representing Istanbul
 Chairman, Turkey-USA Inter Parliamentary Friendship Caucus of the Turkish Parliament
 Advisory Board Chairman, Istanbul 2010 European Capital of Culture Initiative.
 Honorary board member of the Siirt Solidarity Foundation.

As a top adviser to the Prime Minister Recep Tayyip Erdoğan, Bağış played a key role in the Justice and Development Party's (AKP) policies.

Federation of Turkish American Associations
Bağış formerly served as the president of the Federation of Turkish American Associations, the New York-based umbrella organization of Turkish-Americans that sponsored his green card petition in the United States. He has also served as a member of the Advisory Board on Turkish Citizens Abroad, a government body. He was the manager of the Antik Bar at the Jolly Madison Hotel serving the Turkish American community. He also founded the Turkish Link, a New York-based translation agency specialized in the Turkish and English languages.

Controversies

Protests of 2013

During the 2013 protests in Turkey, Bağış attracted criticism for his comments that "Everyone who enters Taksim Square will be treated like a terrorist." In an officially published statement, and despite claims and evidence presented by organizations such as Amnesty International, Bağış claimed that "There is no state violence in Turkey". In the same statement, he claimed that "Turkey has the most reformist and strongest government in Europe and the most charismatic and strongest leader in the world. Should anyone have a problem with this, then I am truly sorry. Only for those who feel overwhelmed is the leadership of Prime Minister Erdoğan a problem."

Germany's Foreign Ministry summoned the Turkish ambassador to protest after Bağış accused German Chancellor Angela Merkel of "picking on" Turkey for domestic political gain before German elections, after Merkel criticized the crackdown as "much too strong". The accusation came after Germany blocked a decision to move forward the membership negotiations after the crackdown. Bağış said that if Merkel is looking for "internal political material" ahead of Germany's September elections, "this should not be Turkey". He also pointed to the election defeat last year of then-French President Nicolas Sarkozy, a fellow opponent of Turkish EU membership.

"Masturbation" remark
In January 2013 Bağış compared the campaign to recognize the Assyrian genocide and Armenian genocide in Sweden to "masturbation" . He later apologised for his remark.

Corruption scandal

As part of claims that Bağış, along with 3 other ministers, engaged in severely corrupt conduct, Bağış was the only one out of the four charged ministers who had not resigned on 25 December 2013. Despite Bağış claiming innocence, that evening, Prime Minister Erdoğan announced a major cabinet reshuffle, removing Bağış from his post as the Minister for European Union through his publicly unannounced official resignation.

Ambassador
Bağış was appointed ambassador of Turkey to the Czech Republic by September 2019, replacing Ahmet Necati Bigalı.

See also
 2013 corruption scandal in Turkey

References

External links

21st-century Turkish diplomats
1970 births
Living people
People from Bingöl
Justice and Development Party (Turkey) politicians
Baruch College alumni
Deputies of Istanbul
Members of the 24th Parliament of Turkey
Members of the 23rd Parliament of Turkey
Members of the 22nd Parliament of Turkey
Ministers of European Union Affairs of Turkey
Ministers of State of Turkey
Members of the 60th government of Turkey
Ambassadors of Turkey to the Czech Republic